The 2021–22 Texas Longhorns women's basketball team represented the University of Texas at Austin in the 2021–22 NCAA Division I women's basketball season. The team was coached by Vic Schaefer who entered his second season at Texas. The Longhorns were members of the Big 12 Conference and played their home games at the Frank Erwin Center. 

This was the Longhorns' final season at the Frank Erwin Center, with the new Moody Center opening for the 2022–23 season.

Previous season
The Longhorns finished the season 21–10, 11–7 in Big 12 play to finish in fifth place. In the 2021 Big 12 Conference women's basketball tournament, Texas went 1–1 with a win against Iowa State and a second round loss to Baylor. However, the Longhorns are coming off a strong showing in the 2021 NCAA Division I women's basketball tournament, making it to elite 8. In the NCAA tournament, the Longhorns defeated Bradley, UCLA, and Maryland. In the elite 8 game, Texas was defeated by 6th ranked South Carolina 62–34.

Offseason

Departures

^Chevalier transferred seven games into the 2021-2022 season.

Incoming Transfers

2021 recruiting class

|-
| colspan="7" style="padding-left:10px;" | Overall recruiting rankings:
|-
| colspan="7" style="font-size:85%; background:#F5F5F5;" | 

|}

2022 Recruiting class

|-
| colspan="7" style="padding-left:10px;" | Overall recruiting rankings:
|-
| colspan="7" style="font-size:85%; background:#F5F5F5;" | 

|}

Coaching staff departures

^Elena Lovato is currently not coaching at the collegiate level.

2021 WNBA draft

Preseason

Big 12 media poll

Preseason All-Big 12 teams

1st team

Joanne Allen-Taylor – G (Coaches, Media)

Honorable Mention

Rori Harmon – G (Coaches, Media)

Preseason Big 12 Awards

Roster

Schedule and results

|-
!colspan=12 style=| Exhibition 

|-
!colspan=9 style=|Regular season (23–6)

|-
!colspan=9 style=|Big 12 tournament (3–0)

|-
!colspan=9 style=|NCAA tournament (3–1)

Source:Schedule

Big 12 tournament
Texas entered the Big 12 tournament as a 3 seed. In the first and second round, Texas defeated Kansas State 72–65 and Iowa State 82–73 to advance to the championship game. In the championship, the Longhorns emerged victorious against Baylor 67–58, winning the Big 12 tournament. Freshman Rori Harmon won most outstanding player and Lauren Ebo was selected to all-tournament team. This is the first Big 12 conference tournament championship for Texas since 2003.

*denotes overtime

NCAA tournament

Texas entered the NCAA tournament as a 2-seed where they faced off against 15-seed Fairfield. The Longhorns would go on to defeat the Stags 70–52, advancing Texas to the round of 32. In the round of 32, Texas played against 7-seed Utah. Texas defeated the Utes 78–56 sending them to the sweet 16 to match up with Ohio State. Against the Buckeyes, Texas won 66–63 advance Texas to their second consecutive elite 8. In the elite 8, the Longhorns faced Stanford, who they beat earlier in the regular season. However, Stanford prevailed against Texas, winning the game 59–50.

Spokane Regional final

Team and individual statistics

Game highs

Awards and honors

Sources:

Sources:

Rankings

^Coaches did not release a Week 1 poll.

See also
 2021–22 Texas Longhorns men's basketball team

References

Texas Longhorns women's basketball seasons
Texas
Texas
Texas Longhorns
Texas Longhorns